Dylan Alcott defeated the two-time defending champion David Wagner in the final, 6–2, 6–3 to win the quad singles wheelchair tennis title at the 2015 Australian Open.

Seeds

Draw

Final

Round robin
Standings are determined by: 1. number of wins; 2. number of matches; 3. in two-players-ties, head-to-head records; 4. in three-players-ties, percentage of sets won, or of games won; 5. steering-committee decision.

References
 Draw

Wheelchair Quad Singles
2015 Quad Singles